Anand Amritraj and Vijay Amritraj won the doubles title at the 1977 Queen's Club Championships tennis tournament defeating David Lloyd and John Lloyd in the final 6–1, 6–2.

Seeds

Draw

Final

Top half

Bottom half

References

External links
Official website Queen's Club Championships 
ATP Tournament Profile

Doubles